San Pedro de la Nave-Almendra is a municipality located in the province of Zamora, Castile and León, Spain. According to the 2004 census (INE), the municipality has a population of 477 inhabitants.

It is home to the medieval church San Pedro de la Nave, a structure which was relocated when it was threatened by the construction of the Ricobayo reservoir.

Town hall
San Pedro de la Nave-Almendra is home to the town hall of 4 towns:
San Pedro de la Nave-Almendra (337 inhabitants, INE 2020).
Almendra (156 inhabitants, INE 2020).
Valdeperdices (148 inhabitants, INE 2020).
El Campillo (33 inhabitants, INE 2020).

References

Municipalities of the Province of Zamora